The Nun and the Devil (Italian: Le Monache di Sant'Arcangelo) is an erotic 1973 Italian nunsploitation film directed by Domenico Paolella. It is also known as: Sisters of Satan (UK) and The Nuns of Saint Archangel (US). The action is set in the 16th century at the convent of Sant Arcangelo, near Naples, then under Spanish rule. The success of the film resulted in another period drama/nunsploitation film by Paolella released the same year, Story of a Cloistered Nun, an Italian/French/West German co-production starring Eleonora Giorgi.

The opening credits state that the movie is "Based on authentic 16th Century records and a story by Stendhal"—possibly Stendhal's L'Abbesse de Castro (1832) is meant.

Plot 
The story involves the power struggles and sexual intrigues of a group of good-looking nuns at the Sant Arcangelo Convent and in particular the machinations of Sister Julia (played by former Miss Great Britain Anne Heywood) as she attempts, by any means possible, to succeed to the position of the dying Mother Superior. The nuns struggle with their vows of celibacy, some inclining to lesbianism whilst others invite male lovers secretly into their cells. Meanwhile, a corrupt church hopes to benefit from an aristocratic donation to the Convent, before launching an inquisition into the lubricious and corrupt activities of the inmates of the Convent. There then follow graphic scenes of torture as miscreant nuns are stripped naked and tortured with a variety of devices in order to elicit a confession of their misdemeanours. The film ends with a resonant condemnation of the power hungry and corrupt church by Sister Julia after she has been found guilty and compelled to take poison to end her life.

Cast 
 Anne Heywood: Sister Julia 
 Luc Merenda: Vicar Carafa
 Ornella Muti: Sister Isabella   
 Pier Paolo Capponi: Don Carlos Ribera
 Martine Brochard: Sister Chiara
 Claudia Gravy (credited as Claudia Gravi): Sister Carmela 
 Maria Cumani Quasimodo: Sister Lavinia
 Claudio Gora: Cardinal d'Arezzo 
 Duilio Del Prete:	Pietro

Production
The production gets permission to shoot the scenes in a real convent (Fossanova Abbey in Priverno, Latina, Italy) because the religious are not told the plot precisely .

In popular culture 
The electro-industrial band My Life with the Thrill Kill Kult has sampled the English-language dub of the film extensively in songs such as "And This Is What the Devil Does" and "Kooler Than Jesus".

References

External links
 

1973 films
1973 drama films
1973 LGBT-related films
1970s Italian-language films
French LGBT-related films
Italian LGBT-related films
Lesbian-related films
LGBT-related drama films
Nunsploitation films
Italian films based on actual events
Films set in the 16th century
Films set in Naples
Films directed by Domenico Paolella
Films scored by Piero Piccioni
1970s Italian films
1970s French films